Horace James Caulkins (1850–1923) was an American ceramic artist living in Detroit, Michigan, he began his career as a dental supplier.  In doing this he developed a kiln for firing dental enamel, the products from which were marketed under the trade name of Revelation.   In 1903 he formed a partnership with Mary Chase Perry, another ceramic artist, and began using his technology with her understanding of glazes to ceramics, still using the name Revelation.  In 1904 the name was changed to Pewabic Pottery.

Sources
 Cameron, Elisabeth,  Encyclopedia of Pottery and Porcelain: 1800-1960, Facts On File Publications, New York and London,  1986

External links
 

1850 births
1932 deaths
American ceramists